Victor Louis Littig (December 7, 1873 – July 13, 1936) was an American football player and coach.  He served as the head football coach at the University of North Dakota in 1900.

Littig played college football at the University of Iowa. He served as the first football coach at Davenport High School.

In 1916, Littig coach the Davenport Athletic Club team to a 7–2–1 record despite enduring a player revolt.

References

1873 births
1936 deaths
American football ends
Iowa Hawkeyes football players
North Dakota Fighting Hawks football coaches
High school football coaches in Iowa
People from Davenport, Iowa
Players of American football from Iowa